The O. W. Gardner House is a historic house in Winchester, Massachusetts.  The -story wood-frame house was built c. 1840 by Oliver W. Gardner, and was originally one of a pair built in the area (the other is no longer extant).  It is one of Winchester's finest examples of Gothic Revival architecture, with elaborate scroll-sawn vergeboard in its steep gables, which also occurs in miniature on the gable-roofed portico that shelters the door.  It has windows topped by label mouldings, and some windows are topped by a Gothic pointed-arch.  The corner boards have elaborately grooved pilasters.

The house was listed on the National Register of Historic Places in 1989.

See also
National Register of Historic Places listings in Winchester, Massachusetts

References

Houses on the National Register of Historic Places in Winchester, Massachusetts
Houses in Winchester, Massachusetts
National Register of Historic Places in Middlesex County, Massachusetts